Belinda Bencic was the champion the last time the event was held in 2017, but chose to compete in St. Petersburg instead.

Dayana Yastremska won the title, defeating Ajla Tomljanović in the final, 6–2, 2–6, 7–6(7–3).

Seeds

Draw

Finals

Top half

Bottom half

Qualifying

Seeds

Qualifiers

Qualifying draw

First qualifier

Second qualifier

Third qualifier

Fourth qualifier

Fifth qualifier

Sixth qualifier

External links
 Main Draw
 Qualifying Draw

Singles
Thailand Open - Singles
 in women's tennis